Cordylogyne is a genus of plants in the family Apocynaceae, first described as a genus in 1838. It contains only one accepted species, Cordylogyne globosa, native to South Africa. Three other names have been proposed in the genus, also native to southern Africa, but at present they are listed as "unresolved," i.e., of uncertain affiliation.

Species of unresolved status
 Cordylogyne argillicola Dinter - Namibia 
 Cordylogyne kassnerianum (Schltr.) Eyles  - South Africa
 Cordylogyne mossambicense (Schltr.) Eyles - Mozambique

References

Asclepiadoideae
Flora of Southern Africa
Monotypic Apocynaceae genera